The 1946 Oregon Webfoots football team was an American football team that represented the University of Oregon in the Pacific Coast Conference (PCC) during the 1946 college football season.  In their sixth and final season under head coach Tex Oliver, the Webfoots compiled a 4–4–1 record (3–4–1 against PCC opponents), finished in sixth place in the PCC, and were outscored by their opponents, 118 to 81. The team played its home games at Hayward Field in Eugene, Oregon.

Schedule

After the season

The 1947 NFL Draft was held on December 16, 1946. The following Webfoots were selected.

References

Oregon
Oregon Ducks football seasons
Oregon Webfoots football